Dakota is a 1945 American  Western film directed by Joseph Kane, and starring John Wayne.  The supporting cast features Walter Brennan, Ward Bond, and Mike Mazurki.

Plot
The action is set in 1875. Wayne stars as John Devlin (John Wayne), a professional gambler who has married Sandra (Vera Ralston), daughter of railroad millionaire Marko Poli (Hugo Haas). John and Sandra flee her father's anger and go to Fargo in Dakota Territory, where Sandra thinks they can cash in on a land boom. But on the trip west, they are swindled out of their stake ($20,000 Sandra swiped from her father). In a desperate attempt to get back their money, Devlin enters into a heated range battle against the outlaws led by Bender.

Bender steals their money & uses it to attempt to buy the properties of the landowners in Fargo, Dakota. Devlin tries to prevent it but cannot. So he offers to buy the land contracts with the threat that he can ask Sandi's father to pass through another town which will mean Bender's purchase will be useless.

Right as Bender hands the lands over to Devlin an agent of Mr. Poli arrives with a secret intent to buy the lands. Bender finds out & Devlin runs away with the contract giving it to one of the settlers. As soon as Devlin leaves the house Bender's men enter & take away the contract & murder the settler.

When Devlin returns to town he is greeted by Bender who attempts to frame & hang him. Right then a group of settlers arrive on horseback with the lands of the settlers burning in the background.

Devlin goes looking for Bender & his second in command. As Bender is packing to skip town the second in command kills him & steals his money.

Devlin tackles the second in command & as they are about to leave for California Sandy (Devlin's wife) tells him that she gave the money she had to the boat captain to help him buy a new boat (since he ran aground the other boat when carrying them to Fargo).

Cast

 John Wayne as John Devlin
 Vera Hruba Ralston as Sandy Poli (Devlin) 
 Walter Brennan as Capt. Bounce of the Riverbird
 Ward Bond as Jim Bender
 Mike Mazurki as Bigtree Collins
 Ona Munson as Jersey Thomas
 Olive Blakeney as Mrs. Stowe
 Hugo Haas as Marko Poli
 Nick Stewart as Nicodemus (as Nicodemus Stewart)
 Paul Fix as Carp
 Grant Withers as Slagin
 Robert Livingston as Lieutenant
 Olin Howland as Devlin's driver (as Olin Howlin)
 Pierre Watkin as Wexton Geary 
 Robert Barrat as Anson Stowe (as Robert H. Barrat)
 Jonathan Hale as Col. Wordin
 Robert Blake as Little Boy (as Bobby Blake)
 Paul Hurst as Captain Spotts
 Eddy Waller as Stagecoach Driver
 Sarah Padden as Mrs. Plummer
 Jack La Rue as Suade
 George Cleveland as Mr. Plummer
 Selmer Jackson as Dr. Judson
 Claire Du Brey as Wahtonka
 Roy Barcroft as Poli's Driver

See also
 List of American films of 1945
 John Wayne filmography

References

External links
 
 
 
 
 Review at Variety

1945 films
1945 Western (genre) films
American Western (genre) films
American black-and-white films
Films directed by Joseph Kane
Films scored by Walter Scharf
Films set in North Dakota
Films with screenplays by Howard Estabrook
Republic Pictures films
1940s English-language films
1940s American films